Cephetola cephena, the cephena epitola, is a butterfly in the family Lycaenidae. It is found in Guinea, Sierra Leone, Ivory Coast, Ghana, Togo, Nigeria, Cameroon, Gabon, the Republic of the Congo, the Central African Republic, the Democratic Republic of the Congo, Uganda and Tanzania.

Subspecies
Cephetola cephena cephena (Guinea, Sierra Leone, Ivory Coast, Ghana, Togo, southern Nigeria, Cameroon, Gabon, Congo, Central African Republic, Democratic Republic of the Congo)
Cephetola cephena entebbeana (Bethune-Baker, 1926) (eastern Democratic Republic of the Congo, Uganda, north-western Tanzania)

References

External links
Seitz, A. Die Gross-Schmetterlinge der Erde 13: Die Afrikanischen Tagfalter. Plate XIII 65 e also (synonym) as leonina Bethune-Baker, 1903

Butterflies described in 1873
Poritiinae
Butterflies of Africa
Taxa named by William Chapman Hewitson